The Church of Jesus Christ of Latter-day Saints in Washington may refer to:

 The Church of Jesus Christ of Latter-day Saints in Washington (state)
 The Church of Jesus Christ of Latter-day Saints in Washington, D.C.